Antonio II Boncompagni Ludovisi (1735–1805) was the Prince of Piombino, Marquis of Populonia, Prince of Venosa and Count of Conza, Lord di Scarlino, Populonia, Vignale, Abbadia del Fango, Suvereto, Buriano, Cerboli e Palmaiolan, and Lord prince of the Tuscan Archipelago including the islands of Elba, Montecristo, Pianosa, Gorgona, Capraia, and Isola del Giglio, from 1733 until he was deposed in 1801.

References
 Mauro Carrara, Signori e principi di Piombino, Bandecchi & Vivaldi, Pontedera 1996.

Princes of Piombino
1735 births
1805 deaths